Lindbergh Viaduct is a historic concrete arch bridge located at Reading in Berks County, Pennsylvania. It is a multiple span , open-spandrel concrete arch bridge with 13 spans, constructed in 1927. There are five main spans, each , and eight secondary spans. It crosses Mineral Spring Creek.

The Lindbergh Viaduct was provisionally known as the Mineral Springs Road Viaduct. Its name was changed on June 15, 1927 when Reading City Council dedicated the viaduct in honor of famed aviator Charles Lindbergh who completed his solo transatlantic flight that year.

It was listed on the National Register of Historic Places in 1988.

References 

Road bridges on the National Register of Historic Places in Pennsylvania
Bridges completed in 1927
Bridges in Berks County, Pennsylvania
National Register of Historic Places in Reading, Pennsylvania
Concrete bridges in the United States
Open-spandrel deck arch bridges in the United States